The Panasonic FS-A1WSX released in 1989 was the last MSX2+ made by Panasonic. It was the successor of FS-A1WX and incorporated few changes like S-Video output, no tape support, color printer support and an improved A1 Internal Cockpit software with a Kanji color word processor.

Contrary to other MSX2+ systems the Panasonic FS-A1 used a Z-80 compatible MSX-Engine (T9769x) which could be switched via software to 6 MHz. This model supported up to 256 KB of RAM after doing a little soldering. 512 KB was also possible with a more complicated modification.

Technical specifications
Processor
 Z-80 compatible MSX-Engine (T9769x) with clock speeds of 3.58 and 5.37 MHz
Memory
ROM: 1552 KB
MSX BASIC v3.0: 80 KB
MSX Disk BASIC v1.0: 16 KB
Music BASIC (FM BIOS): 16 KB
JIS 1st & 2nd class Kanji Support: 256KB
MSX-JE: 512KB
MSX-JE/WP (MSX Word Processor): 656 KB
RAM: 64 KB
VRAM: 128 KB
SRAM: 16 KB
Display
VDP
Yamaha YM9958
Text: 80×24, 40×24 and 32×24 (characters per line × lines)
Graphical: resolution max 512×212 pixels (16 colours out of 512) and 256×212 (19,268 colours)
Colours: 19,268 max
Sprites: 32 max
Sound
PSG
Yamaha AY-3-8910 (embedded in MSX Engine)
MSX Music
Yamaha OPLL YM-2413
Storage Memory
 720 KB 3 1/2" DD/DS floppy disks

References

External links
 old-computers.com 

Panasonic computers
MSX